The 2019 Louisiana Tech Bulldogs baseball team represented Louisiana Tech University in the 2019 NCAA Division I baseball season. The Bulldogs played the majority of their home games at J. C. Love Field at Pat Patterson Park. One weekend series was played at the baseball field at Ruston High School due to the deadly tornados that struck Ruston in April. In early May, it was declared that the university was looking into building a new stadium for the baseball team and that they would likely never use J. C. Love Field at Pat Patterson Park again.

Roster
{| class="toccolours" style="text-align: left; font-size:90%;"
|-
! colspan="9" style="; text-align:center;"| 2019 Louisiana Tech Bulldogs roster
|-
|width="03"| 
|valign="top"|
Pitchers
6 Kyle Griffen - Junior
13 Tyler Follis - Junior
16 Logan Robbins - Redshirt Senior
22 Matt Miller - Redshirt Senior
24 Braxton Smith - Redshirt Senior
28 Quinton Logan - Senior
29 Dane Kapande - Junior
31 Logan Bailey - Senior
33 Tanner Propst - Redshirt Sophomore
36 David Leal - Senior
37 Bryce Fagan - Redshirt Junior
39 Beau Billings - Freshman
39 Luke Honeycutt - Freshman
47 Jonathan Fincher - Redshirt Freshman

|width="15"| 
|valign="top"|
Catchers
12 Philip Matulia - Freshman
14 Chris Clayton - Senior
40 Tyler Kersh - Redshirt Freshman

Infielders
1 Champ Artigues - Freshman
4 Grant Jones - Redshirt Junior
8 Taylor Young - Sophomore
9 Hunter Wells - Redshirt Junior
15 Blake Johnson - Junior
25 Tanner Huddleston - Senior
26 Graham Hackbarth - Senior

Outfielders
2 Parker Bates - Junior
3 Mason Robinson - Redshirt Senior
5 Mason Mallard - Redshirt Senior
7 Adarius Myers - Freshman
11 Steele Netterville - Sophomore
17 Seth White - Redshirt Sophomore
18 Bryce Wallace - Freshman
19 Manny Garcia - Junior
20 Hudson Hopkins - Redshirt Junior
21 Shelton Wallace - Senior
|}

Coaching staff

Schedule

! style="" | Regular Season
|- valign="top" 

|- align="center" bgcolor="#ccffcc"
| 1 || February 15 || at Southeastern Louisiana || Pat Kenelly Diamond at Alumni Field • Hammond, LA || W 13–8 || 1–0 ||
|- align="center" bgcolor="#ccffcc"
| 2 || February 16 || at Southeastern Louisiana || Pat Kenelly Diamond at Alumni Field • Hammond, LA || W 15–11 || 2–0 ||
|- align="center" bgcolor="#ccffcc"
| 3 || February 17 || at Southeastern Louisiana || Pat Kenelly Diamond at Alumni Field • Hammond, LA || W 12-8 || 3–0 || 
|- align="center" bgcolor="#ccffcc"
| 4 || February 20 || Louisiana || J. C. Love Field at Pat Patterson Park • Ruston, LA || W 3–2 (10 inn) || 4–0 ||
|- align="center" bgcolor="#ffcccc"
| 5 || February 23 || Troy || J. C. Love Field at Pat Patterson Park • Ruston, LA || L 3–4 || 4–1 ||
|- align="center" bgcolor="#ccffcc"
| 6 || February 24 || Troy || J. C. Love Field at Pat Patterson Park • Ruston, LA || W 11–4 || 5–1 ||
|- align="center" bgcolor="#ffcccc"
| 7 || February 24 || Troy || J. C. Love Field at Pat Patterson Park • Ruston, LA || L 5-7 || 5-2 ||
|- align="center" bgcolor="#ccffcc"
| 8 || February 26 || at Little Rock || Gary Hogan Field • Little Rock, AR || W 5–3 (12 inn) || 6–2 ||
|-

|- align="center" bgcolor="#ccffcc"
| 9 || March 1 || Arkansas State || J. C. Love Field at Pat Patterson Park • Ruston, LA || W 9–4 || 7–2 ||
|- align="center" bgcolor="#ccffcc"
| 10 || March 2 || Arkansas State || J. C. Love Field at Pat Patterson Park • Ruston, LA || W 5–4 || 8–2 ||
|- align="center" bgcolor="#ccffcc"
| 11 || March 2 || Arkansas State || J. C. Love Field at Pat Patterson Park • Ruston, LA || W 8–6 || 9–2 ||
|- align="center" bgcolor="#ffcccc"
| 12 || March 5 || Northwestern State || J. C. Love Field at Pat Patterson Park • Ruston, LA || L 4-8 || 9–3 ||
|- align="center" bgcolor="#ffcccc"
| 13 || March 8 || at #10 Arkansas || Baum-Walker Stadium • Fayetteville, AR || L 2–4 || 9–4 ||
|- align="center" bgcolor="#ccffcc"
| 14 || March 9 || at #10 Arkansas || Baum-Walker Stadium • Fayetteville, AR || W 12–7 || 10–4 ||
|- align="center" bgcolor="#ffcccc"
| 15 || March 10 || at #10 Arkansas || Baum-Walker Stadium • Fayetteville, AR || L 0–11 || 10–5 ||
|- align="center" bgcolor="#ccffcc"
| 16 || March 12 || Sam Houston State || J. C. Love Field at Pat Patterson Park • Ruston, LA || W 7-0 || 11–5 ||
|- align="center" bgcolor="#cccccc"
| 17 || March 13 || Sam Houston State || J. C. Love Field at Pat Patterson Park • Ruston, LA || colspan=4 |Game canceled''
|- align="center" bgcolor="#ffcccc"
| 18 || March 15 || Southern Miss || J. C. Love Field at Pat Patterson Park • Ruston, LA || L 9–12 || 11–6 || 0-1
|- align="center" bgcolor="#ffcccc"
| 19 || March 16 || Southern Miss || J. C. Love Field at Pat Patterson Park • Ruston, LA || L 1-5 || 11-7 || 0-2
|- align="center" bgcolor="#ffcccc"
| 20 || March 27 || Southern Miss || J. C. Love Field at Pat Patterson Park • Ruston, LA || L 5-10 || 11–8 || 0-3
|- align="center" bgcolor="#ccffcc"
| 21 || March 19 || Mississippi Valley State || J. C. Love Field at Pat Patterson Park • Ruston, LA || W 21-1 || 12–8 ||
|- align="center" bgcolor="#ccffcc"
| 22 || March 22 || at Middle Tennessee || Reese Smith Jr. Field • Murfreesboro, TN || W 5-1 || 13–8 || 1-3
|- align="center" bgcolor="#ffcccc"
| 23 || March 23 || at Middle Tennessee || Reese Smith Jr. Field • Murfreesboro, TN || L 1-4 || 13–9 || 1-4
|- align="center" bgcolor="#ffcccc"
| 24 || March 24 || at Middle Tennessee || Reese Smith Jr. Field • Murfreesboro, TN || W 10-5 || 14–9 || 2-4
|- align="center" bgcolor="#ffcccc"
| 25 || March 26 || Louisiana-Monroe || J. C. Love Field at Pat Patterson Park • Ruston, LA || L 4–9 || 14–10 || 
|- align="center" bgcolor="#ccffcc
| 26 || March 29 || UAB || J. C. Love Field at Pat Patterson Park • Ruston, LA || W 3–2 || 15–10 || 3-4
|- align="center" bgcolor="#ccffcc
| 27 || March 30 || UAB || J. C. Love Field at Pat Patterson Park • Ruston, LA || W 7–6 || 16–10 || 4-4
|- align="center" bgcolor="#ccffcc
| 28 || March 31 || UAB || J. C. Love Field at Pat Patterson Park • Ruston, LA || W 5–2 || 17–10 || 5-4
|-

|- align="center" bgcolor="#ccffcc"
| 29 || April 3 || McNeese State || J. C. Love Field at Pat Patterson Park • Ruston, LA || W 10-4 || 18–10 ||
|- align="center" bgcolor="#ccffcc"
| 30 || April 5 || UTSA || J. C. Love Field at Pat Patterson Park • Ruston, LA || W 4–2 || 19–10 || 6–4
|- align="center" bgcolor="#ccffcc"
| 31 || April 5 || UTSA || J. C. Love Field at Pat Patterson Park • Ruston, LA || W 8–7 || 20–10 || 7–4
|- align="center" bgcolor="#ccffcc"
| 32 || April 7 || UTSA || J. C. Love Field at Pat Patterson Park • Ruston, LA || W 6–3 || 21–10 || 8–4
|- align="center" bgcolor="#ccffcc"
| 33 || April 9 || at Louisiana || M. L. Tigue Moore Field at Russo Park • Lafayette, LA || W 11-3 || 22-10 ||
|- align="center" bgcolor="#ccffcc"
| 34 || April 12 || at #24 Florida Atlantic || FAU Baseball Stadium • Boca Raton, FL || W 5–3 || 23–10 || 9–4
|- align="center" bgcolor="#ccffcc"
| 35 || April 13 || at #24 Florida Atlantic || FAU Baseball Stadium • Boca Raton, FL || W 2–1 || 24–10 || 10–4
|- align="center" bgcolor="#ffcccc"
| 36 || April 14 || at #24 Florida Atlantic || FAU Baseball Stadium • Boca Raton, FL || L 3–11 || 24–11 || 10–5
|- align="center" bgcolor="#ccffcc"
| 37 || April 16 || at Louisiana-Monroe || Warhawk Field • Monroe, LA || W 5–0 || 25–11 ||
|- align="center" bgcolor="#ffcccc"
| 38 || April 18 || Marshall || J. C. Love Field at Pat Patterson Park • Ruston, LA || L 3-7 || 25–12 || 10–6
|- align="center" bgcolor="#ccffcc"
| 39 || April 19 || Marshall || J. C. Love Field at Pat Patterson Park • Ruston, LA || W 19-6 || 26–12 || 11–6
|- align="center" bgcolor="#ccffcc"
| 40 || April 20 || Marshall || J. C. Love Field at Pat Patterson Park • Ruston, LA || W 11–1 (7 inn) || 27–12 || 12-6
|- align="center" bgcolor="#ccffcc"
| 41 || April 23 || Little Rock || J. C. Love Field at Pat Patterson Park • Ruston, LA || W 5–4 || 28–12 || 
|- align="center" bgcolor="#ffcccc"
| 42 || April 24 || at McNeese State || Joe Miller Ballpark • Lake Charles, LA || L 3-5 || 28–13 ||
|- align="center" bgcolor="#ffcccc"
| 43 || April 26 || at Rice || Reckling Park • Houston, TX || L 1–3 || 28–14 || 12-7
|- align="center" bgcolor="#ffcccc"
| 44 || April 27 || at Rice || Reckling Park • Houston, TX || L 2–4 || 28–15 || 12-8
|- align="center" bgcolor="#ffcccc"
| 45 || April 28 || at Rice || Reckling Park • Houston, TX || L 2–3 (10 inn) || 28–16 || 12-9
|- align="center" bgcolor="#ffcccc"
| 46 || April 30 || at Northwestern State || H. Alvin Brown-C. C. Stroud Field • Natchitoches, LA || L 1–3 || 28–17 ||
|-

|- align="center" bgcolor="#ffcccc"
| 47 || May 3 || at Old Dominion || Bud Metheny Baseball Complex • Norfolk, VA || L 6–14 || 28–18 || 12-10
|- align="center" bgcolor="#ccffcc"
| 48 || May 4 || at Old Dominion || Bud Metheny Baseball Complex • Norfolk, VA || W 4-2 || 29–18 || 13-10
|- align="center" bgcolor="#ffcccc"
| 49 || May 4 || at Old Dominion || Bud Metheny Baseball Complex • Norfolk, VA || L 3–7 || 29–19 || 13-11
|- align="center" bgcolor="#ccffcc"
| 50 || May 7 || at #15 LSU || Alex Box Stadium, Skip Bertman Field • Baton Rouge, LA || W 12–1 || 30–19 ||
|- align="center" bgcolor="#ffcccc"
| 51 || May 10 || Western Kentucky ||  Ruston High School Baseball Field • Ruston, LA || L 4–5 || 30–20 || 13-12
|- align="center" bgcolor="#ccffcc"
| 52 || May 12 || Western Kentucky || Ruston High School Baseball Field • Ruston, LA || W 6-1 (7 inn) || 31–20 || 14-12
|- align="center" bgcolor="#ccffcc"
| 53 || May 12 || Western Kentucky || Ruston High School Baseball Field • Ruston, LA || W 8–3 (7 inn) || 32–20 || 15-12
|- align="center" bgcolor="#ffcccc"
| 54 || May 14 || at #5 Mississippi State ||Dudy Noble Field, Polk–DeMent Stadium • Starkville, MS || L 3–9 || 32–21 ||
|- align="center" bgcolor="#ccffcc"
| 55 || May 16 || at FIU || Infinity Insurance Park • Miami, FL || W 3–0 || 33–21 || 16-12
|- align="center" bgcolor="#ccffcc"
| 56 || May 17 || at FIU || Infinity Insurance Park • Miami, FL || W 5–2 || 34–21 || 17-12
|- align="center" bgcolor="#ffcccc"
| 57 || May 18 || at FIU || Infinity Insurance Park • Miami, FL || L 4–5 || 34–22 || 17-13
|-

|-
! style="" | Post-Season
|- valign="top" 

|- align="center" bgcolor="#ffcccc"
| 58 || May 22 || vs. Marshall || MGM Park • Biloxi, MS || L 4–6 (12 inn) || 34–23 ||
|- align="center" bgcolor="#ffcccc"
| 59 || May 23 || vs. Rice || MGM Park • Biloxi, MS || L 3-4 || 34-24 ||
|-

|

References

Louisiana Tech Bulldogs
Louisiana Tech Bulldogs baseball seasons
Louisiana Tech Bulldogs baseball